The Descent from the Cross may refer to one of several paintings by Peter Paul Rubens:
 The Descent from the Cross (Rubens, 1600–1602), Siegerland-Museum, Siegen, Oberes Schloss
 The Descent from the Cross (Rubens, 1612–1614), Antwerp Cathedral
 The Descent from the Cross (Rubens, 1617), Palais des Beaux-Arts de Lille
 The Descent from the Cross (Rubens, 1618), Hermitage Museum, St Petersburg

Descent
Rubens